Muhammad Fazal Karim, 1954, was a Pakistani politician who was a senior and the most vocal member of the Sunni Ittehad Council (SIC), which is an amalgamation of several Barelvi parties. He was elected from Faisalabad, a member of the National Assembly (MNA) for his first term as a PML(N) candidate and was previously politically affiliated with Jamiat Ulema-e-Pakistan (JUP). He was later senior vice president of the Sunni Ittehad Council. Suffering from liver cancer, he was hospitalised in Faisalabad in critical condition on April 4, 2013, and died on 15 April 2013.

Early life 
Fazal Karim was born on 24 October 1954 at Faisalabad. He was son of Islamic scholar Sardar Ahmad Chishti He did his post graduation in Islamic studies from Jamia Rizvia in the year 1987.

Political career 

Karim got elected to Provincial Assembly of Punjab in 1993 as a member of Pakistan Muslim League (N) and remained till the dissolution of the assembly in 1997. He held the office of Provincial Minister for Religious Affairs during this tenure. In 2002 he got elected on Pakistan Muslim League (N)'s ticket from NA-82 this time for the National Assembly of Pakistan and completed his five-year term. He was again elected in 2008 from the same constituency. His role is essential in Anjuman-e-Talba-e-Islam Faisalabad with Maulana Bashir Ahmad Sialvi. Under his leadership SIC started long March named, Labaik Ya Rasoolallah long march with the support of Jamaat Ahle Sunnat, the Sunni Tehreek and the Difa-e-Pakistan Council. Karim stated his view that Pakistan is not a secular country, but rather an Islamic state, and “we will continue our efforts till the enforcement of Islamic law in the country established in the name of Allah after numerous sacrifices."

Death 
PML-N President Nawaz Sharif, Punjab Chief Minister Najam Sethi, former chief minister Shahbaz Shari, and other dignitaries sent their condolences. PST also announced mourning and suspension of political activities for three days.

References 

1954 births
2013 deaths
Pakistan Muslim League (N) politicians
People from Faisalabad
Punjabi people
Pakistani MNAs 2002–2007
Pakistani MNAs 2008–2013